The 2013 F2000 Championship Series season was the eighth season of competition in the series. It consisted of 14 rounds (seven double-race weekends), beginning April 11 at Virginia International Raceway and concluding August 25 at Summit Point Raceway. The race schedule was largely un-changed from the previous year, as only the round at New Jersey Motorsports Park was eliminated and a second weekend at the Mid-Ohio Sports Car Course was added.

Tim Minor clinched the championship after the fourth race at Mid-Ohio, becoming the first Masters Class driver to win the overall championship as well as being becoming the first series champion not to drive a Van Diemen chassis. Minor drove a Citation chassis to victory nine times on his way to the championship and finished either first or second in all but one race. 22-year-old Floridian Kyle Connery won four times and finished second in the championship.

Race calendar and results

Championship standings

This list only contains drivers who registered for the championship.
(M) indicates driver is participating in Masters Class for drivers over 40 years of age.

References

External links
 Official Series Website

F2000
F2000 Championship Series seasons